Kiplangat Sang (born 14 April 1981) is a Kenyan judoka.

He competed at the 2016 Summer Olympics in Rio de Janeiro, in the men's 90 kg.

References

External links
 

1981 births
Living people
Kenyan male judoka
Olympic judoka of Kenya
Judoka at the 2016 Summer Olympics